FC Oryol is a Russian football club based in the city of Oryol. From 2004 to 2006 FC Oryol played in the Russian First Division.

History
Football has been played in Oryol since 1911. In 1960 a team named Lokomotiv was formed in Oryol to play in the Class B of the Soviet championship. In 1963 it was renamed Spartak, in 1973 Stal (meaning "steel"), in 1975 the team was renamed Spartak again.

The team played in Class B until the restructuring of the leagues in 1971, when it entered the Soviet Second League. In 1990–1991 Spartak played in the Second League B.

In 1992 Spartak entered the Russian Second League. In 1993 the team was renamed Oryol. In 1994 Oryol moved to the Third League, and in 1996 they were promoted back after finishing third. In 2003 Oryol finished first in the Centre zone of the Second Division and were promoted to the First Division. The sixth position in 2004 was the best in the club's history. In 2006 Oryol were relegated from the First Division after finishing 20th. The club faced financial problems, thus abandoning their place in the Second Division, was re-created as Spartak Oryol and joined the Amateur Football League. After a year in the amateur league, FC Oryol returned to the Second Division and was once again renamed, entering 2008 season as FC Rusichi Oryol. Rusichi finished mid-table in their first three seasons in the Second Division, with Yevgeni Polyakov becoming the central zone's top scorer with 20 goals in 2010. In winter 2011 rumours circulated that the team would change its name to FC Oryol. Despite being in top five for the most part of 2011/12 season, Rusichi once again finished mid-table (8th place). In summer of 2012 the club announced the name change, finally becoming FC Oryol again. During the winter break of the 2016–17 season, the club experienced financial difficulties and did not finish out the season of the Russian Professional Football League.

Oryol's top achievement in the Russian Cup is the 1/8 final in the 1996–97 competition.

References

External links
Official website 
Fans website FC Oryol, news 
Club history at KLISF

 
Football clubs in Russia
Sport in Oryol
Association football clubs established in 1960
1960 establishments in Russia